The Seminole Heights serial killer is an alleged serial killer who is believed to have murdered four people, three men and one woman, in the Seminole Heights neighborhood of Tampa, Florida, in October and November 2017. All four victims were shot dead seemingly at random.

On November 28, 2017, police arrested North Carolina-born Howell Emanuel "Trai" Donaldson III (one of three children born to Howell Donaldson Jr. and Rosita Donaldson, and raised in Tampa) after he handed a pistol in a bag to his manager at the McDonald's where he worked and instructed her to bury the bag without opening it. Subsequent investigation revealed that the pistol may have fired the bullets used in the killings and that Donaldson's cell phone had been in the vicinity of the killings at the relevant times, while a search of Donaldson's vehicle found clothing similar to that seen in surveillance footage of the killing. 

On that basis, police charged Donaldson with four counts of murder. Donaldson stated that the pistol belonged to him but did not state whether he had committed the killings. Donaldson was indicted on the charges on December 7, 2017. He pleaded not guilty to all charges five days later. 

On January 23, 2018, Hillsborough State Attorney Andrew Warren announced his office would seek the death penalty against Donaldson.

Donaldson's trial is set for the summer of 2023.

Victims

Benjamin Edward Mitchell
A man was shot and killed at about 12:00 noon on October 9, 2017, as he was waiting at a bus stop near North 15th Street and East Frierson Avenue in the Seminole Heights neighborhood. The victim was identified as Benjamin Edward Mitchell, a 22-year-old African American man. He is the first-known victim, chronologically, of the serial killer. Mitchell had left his home about a block away and was on his way to see his girlfriend.

Monica Caridad Hoffa
On the morning of October 13, a city landscape crew was about to mow an overgrown field in the 1000 block of East New Orleans Avenue when they stumbled upon a woman's body. The victim, later identified as Monica Caridad Hoffa, a 32-year-old white female, was shot dead while walking to a friend's home. The shooting is believed to have happened late on October 11 or sometime on October 12. Police said there was no clear connection between Hoffa and Mitchell, the first victim. Her body was found a half mile from where Mitchell was killed.

Anthony Naiboa
A 20-year-old autistic Hispanic man was shot dead at about 7:57 p.m. on October 19, on 15th Street near Wilder Avenue. Anthony Naiboa ended up in the area after taking the wrong bus home from work. He was walking toward a Route 9 stop when he was shot in the head and killed on the sidewalk. He was the eldest of five siblings and child of Carmen Rodriguez and Casimar Naiboa. He was born in the Bronx, New York, and moved to Florida when he was nine years old. He was a rapper on Soundcloud known as "James Firefox" and was part of the Furry fandom.

Ronald Felton
At about 4:50 a.m. on November 14, a 60-year-old man was crossing North Nebraska Avenue just north of East Caracas Street when the suspect came up behind him and fatally shot him. The victim, identified as Ronald Felton, was walking to the New Seasons Apostolic Ministries to meet the pastor to get ready to distribute food to families in need. He had been a volunteer at the food bank for more than a decade.

Community response
On October 13, police deduced that the murders of Mitchell and Hoffa were connected based on ballistic evidence showing bullets from both victims came from the same Glock handgun. They increased patrols in the area and issued a statement urging people to not walk alone at night. Except for a grainy security cam video of a man in a hoodie, Tampa police had very few leads, and no suspects. Dozens of people from the Tampa Bay area came together to mourn the deaths of Mitchell, Hoffa, Naiboa, and Felton on separate occasions, as well.

On October 31, 2017, over 50 police officers were stationed in the Seminole Heights area, as well as Tampa's then-interim police chief Brian Dugan and Tampa Mayor Bob Buckhorn, to ensure a safe night of trick-or-treating for the community's youth. Officers from the Florida Highway Patrol (FHP), Hillsborough County sheriffs office and Tampa officers were stationed throughout the community in cars and on horseback.

A $110,000 reward was put forward for information leading to the person(s) responsible for the murders.

Investigation
Surveillance video from the murders of Mitchell and Felton showed the suspect wearing a hoodie that was apparently light-colored, though detectives said the colors are misleading as dark colors often appear as light colors in infrared video. Furthermore, after Felton's murder, witnesses told police that the suspect was wearing all-dark clothing. At least one witness described the suspect as a black male with a light complexion and a thin build, estimated to be about 6 feet to 6 feet 2 inches tall.

The Tampa Police Department arrested a suspect, Howell Emanuel Donaldson III, on November 28, 2017, at a McDonald's fast food restaurant in Ybor City. Donaldson, who worked at the restaurant, told Delonda Walker, his manager, that he was going to an Amscot location and would leave town after securing a cash advance. He collected his paycheck, turned in his uniform, and then handed her a pistol wrapped in a paper salad bag. Donaldson instructed Walker to tell anybody who asks that she hasn't seen him, not to open the bag, and to bury the bag somewhere deep enough where it wouldn't be accidentally found. He claimed that the bag was involved in his mother's final wish, in a failed attempt to prevent his manager from looking in the bag. 

Walker notified a police officer who, coincidentally, was in the restaurant's parking lot. The officer called for backup, and police were waiting to arrest Donaldson by the time he returned to his vehicle.

Donaldson consented to a search of his vehicle, where Tampa police found clothes, stained with what appeared to be blood and fitting the description derived from security footage and eyewitness accounts. They also discovered that his cell phone location data aligned with the date, time, and location of that provided in the security footage. Tampa police claim that ballistics tests show that Donaldson's Glock was used to commit all four killings, and that shell casings matching the weapon were found at the scenes of the crimes. 

His trial was scheduled to begin on August 10, 2020, but a judge granted a defense motion for Donaldson to be tried for each murder separately, citing the different circumstances surrounding each victim. If found guilty, Donaldson could face the death penalty.

Delonda Walker was given the $110,000 reward for providing information leading to the arrest of the alleged serial killer.

See also
 List of serial killers in the United States

References

External links
"What we know about Tampa's alleged serial killer", Eric Levenson, CNN, November 30, 2017

2017 in Florida
21st-century American criminals
21st century in Tampa, Florida
American serial killers
October 2017 crimes in the United States
November 2017 crimes in the United States
Unidentified American serial killers
2017 murders in the United States